Bean leafroll virus (BLRV) is a plant pathogenic virus of the genus Luteovirus.

External links
ICTVdB - The Universal Virus Database: Bean leaf roll virus
Family Groups - The Baltimore Method

Viral plant pathogens and diseases